Militarie Gun is an American hardcore band from Los Angeles, California. The group has released three extended plays.

History
Frontman Ian Shelton formed Militarie Gun in the spring of 2020, as a result of the COVID-19 pandemic and his other band, Regional Justice Center, having to be put on hold. Shelton decided to write and record an EP, My Life Is Over, which was released in September of that year. After releasing the EP, Shelton expanded the project to include Nick Cogan and William Acuña on guitar, Max Epstein on bass, and Vince Nguyen on drums. Militarie Gun released their second EP in June 2021 titled All Roads Lead to the Gun, and their third EP All Roads Lead to the Gun II in September 2021. A deluxe edition combining the two EPs was released in 2022. In 2023, Militarie Gun released a new song titled Do It Faster. The band released a music video alongside the new song.

References

Musical groups established in 2020